Supreme Balloon is a 2008 studio album by American electronic music duo Matmos, released via Matador Records.

On the album, Matmos skipped sampling antics in favor of a lighthearted "cosmic pop" record made entirely out of synthesizers. The exotic and antiquated synths used here heavily spotlight the classic 1960s/1970s/1980s consumer electronic rigs of Arp, Korg, Roland, Waldorf, and Moog.

Critical reception
At Metacritic, which assigns a weighted average score out of 100 to reviews from mainstream critics, Supreme Balloon received an average score of 78% based on 20 reviews, indicating "generally favorable reviews".

Mark Pytlik of Pitchfork gave the album a 7.5 out of 10, calling it "a woozily beautiful-sounding record, as crystalline, gleaming, and full-bodied as vintage Terry Riley."

Track listing

Charts

References

External links
 

2008 albums
Matmos albums
Matador Records albums